The State Taxation Administration (STA, Chinese: 国家税务总局) is a ministerial-level department within the government of the People's Republic of China. It is under the direction of the State Council, and is responsible for the collection of taxes and enforces the state revenue laws. Previously known as State Administration of Taxation.

Mandates
Drafting tax laws and regulations; formulating detailed implementation rules for tax laws and regulations; putting forward suggestions on tax policies, and together with the Ministry of Finance, reviewing the suggestions and submitting them to the State Council; formulating implementation rules for tax policies.
Measuring the overall tax burden and putting forward suggestions on how to use tax for regulation purpose; formulating tax rules and procedures and supervising their implementation; providing guidance for local tax collection and administration.
Organizing collection and administration for central taxes, shared taxes and contributions to state-designated funds; working out revenue plans; providing interpretation for issues concerning tax collection and administration and general tax policy issues arising from the implementation of tax laws and regulations.
Conducting international exchange and cooperation on taxation; negotiating and applying agreements on avoidance of double taxation and prevention of fiscal evasion with respect to taxes on income and capital.
Regulating the collection and refund of VAT and Excise Tax on imports and exports.
Being responsible for the administration of human resources, salary, size and expenditure of SAT local offices; appointing and supervising the work of directors and deputy directors at the provincial level of SAT offices; advising on the appointment and removal of directors of local tax service at the provincial level.
Facilitating education and training for tax staff at all levels to build up their professional skills and ethical standards.
Organizing tax theoretical research and activities to promote tax awareness among the public; serving and regulating certified tax agents and tax agencies.
Other mandates entrusted by the State Council.

Organization
The Commissioner and four Deputy Commissioners of SAT are appointed by the State Council.

One Chief Economist and one Chief Accountant are also members of the top leadership of the SAT.

Departments
There are 14 functional departments within the Headquarters of SAT, each of which consists of several divisions (offices) as follows:

Other
Besides, some non-governmental institutions directly under the Headquarters of SAT are Education Center, Logistical Service Center, Information Technology Center, Registered Tax Agent Management Center, Tax Science Research Institute, China Taxation Magazine, China Taxation Newspaper, China Taxation Press, Yangzhou Training Center and Changchun Tax College.

Tax classification 

Notes:

1. Slaughter Tax, Banquet Tax and Animal Husbandry Tax are now decentralised to the local governments for administration. Whether levying or not shall be at the discretion of the governments at provincial level for decision by taking into account the local conditions.

2. Inheritance Tax and Security Exchange Tax have not yet been legislated to date.

List of directors

External links 
 

Revenue services
Government agencies of China
Taxation in China
1958 establishments in China
Government agencies established in 1958
State Council of the People's Republic of China
Organizations based in Beijing